Karl Henrik Lorentz Reilin (16 March 1874 – 18 January 1962) was a Finnish sports shooter, who competed at the 1908 and the 1912 Summer Olympics.

He placed fifth at 300 metre rifle, 3 positions team event at the 1914 ISSF World Shooting Championships.

He and Maria Luoma were the parents of Sirkka Elisabeth (1932–), who married Jaakko Tähtinen.

Sources

References

External links
 

1874 births
1962 deaths
People from Ulvila
People from Turku and Pori Province (Grand Duchy of Finland)
Finnish male sport shooters
Olympic shooters of Finland
Shooters at the 1908 Summer Olympics
Shooters at the 1912 Summer Olympics
Sportspeople from Satakunta